Morayvia is a aviation museum located in Kinloss, Moray, Scotland near to Kinloss Barracks (the former RAF Kinloss) a frontline Royal Air Force station.

Exhibits
Exhibits:
 Antonov An-2 Red 14
 Avro Vulcan B.2 XH563 (cockpit)
 BAC Jet Provost T.4 XS176 (cockpit - added October 2012)
 de Havilland Vampire T.11 XD425 (cockpit - added April 2013)
 English Electric Lightning F1.A XM169
 Handley Page HPR.7 Herald 214 Series
 Hawker Siddeley Nimrod XV240 (forward fuselage)
 Hawker Siddeley Nimrod MR.2 XV244 (cockpit)
 Hawker Hunter F.5 WN957
 SEPECAT Jaguar GR.3 XZ113
 Vickers Valiant XD875 (cockpit)
 Westland Dragonfly HR.5 WP495/G-AJOV
 Westland Whirlwind HAR.10 XJ723
 Westland Wessex HC.2 XR528
 Westland Wessex HU.5 XT466
 Westland Sea King HAR.3 XZ592

References

Aerospace museums in Scotland